The Bulgarian Railway Company (BRC) is the first privately held railfreight company to obtain a license in Bulgaria.

Control of BRC is shared by five Bulgarian companies and one Romanian company, Grup Feroviar Român Bucharest.  BRC's chairman is Vladimir Dunchev, who was formerly the general director of the Bulgarian State Railway Company (BDZ).

On April 13, 2005, Bulgaria's transport ministry awarded the first private license to haul freight over the nation's rail network to the Bulgarian Railroad Company.

The BRC locomotive fleet includes class 87 locomotives exported from the UK.

Locomotive Fleet
BRC operate a fleet of second hand locomotives:

Class 40
Electric locomotives
40-0177-2
40-0817-3
40-1001-3
40-1013-8
40-1018-7
40-1019-5
40-1020-7
40-1022-9

Class 87

Formerly British Rail Class 87 electric locomotives
87 003 - 0
87 004 - 8
87 006 - 3
87 007 - 1
87 008 - 9
87 010 - 5
87 012 - 1
87 013 - 9
87 014 - 7
87 019 - 6
87 020 - 4
87 022 - 0
87 026 - 1
87 028 - 7
87 029 - 5
87 033 - 7
87 034 - 5

Class 60
Former Căile Ferate Române diesel locomotives
60 1522 - 6
60 1524 - 2

Class 52
52 - 240

References
 Bulgarian News Network (April 13, 2005), Bulgaria Licenses Private Railroad Carrier. Retrieved April 13, 2005.

Railway companies of Bulgaria